De Trein van zes uur tien  is a 1999 Dutch thriller film directed by Frank Ketelaar.

Cast
Peter Paul Muller	... 	Onno Staling
Roeland Fernhout	... 	Alex Bickers
Rifka Lodeizen	... 	Merel Dankmeijer
Halina Reijn	... 	Mieke Volkers
Rudolf Lucieer	... 	Kumfus
Marnie Blok	... 	Secretaresse Camilla
Jordy Krant	... 	Baby Jacob
Gwen Eckhaus	... 	Spiritueel leidsvrouw
Leopold Witte	... 	Arbeidsbureauman
Hugo Koolschijn	... 	Sociale Dienstman
Alwien Tulner	... 	Anneke
Diederik Ebbinge	... 	Yup
Khaldoun Elmecky	... 	Politieman Brouwer (as Khaldoun el Mecky)
Rodney Beddal	... 	Inspecteur (as Rodney Beddall)
Rinco van der Baan	... 	Ober (as Rimco van der Baan)

External links 
 

1999 films
1990s Dutch-language films
1999 thriller films
Dutch thriller films
Films directed by Frank Ketelaar